La U may refer to:
Club Universitario de Deportes - A traditional Peruvian football club.
Club Universidad de Chile - A Chilean football club.
Club Universitario - A Bolivian football club.